Tokradia is a village in Kamrup rural district, situated in south bank of river Brahmaputra.

Transport
The village is near National Highway 37 and connected to nearby towns and cities with regular buses and other modes of transportation.

See also
 Siliguri
 Sikarhati
 Sidilapara
 Saukuchi
 Satpakhali
 Sarpara

References

Villages in Kamrup district